Tog Wuchale (also known as Wajaale) is a city located in the Eastern Ethiopia on the border of Ethiopia and Somaliland. Tog Wajaale is the main border crossing for goods coming in and out of Ethiopia, primarily from the port city of Berbera, Somaliland's main port. It is one of the busiest border towns of Ethiopia

References 

Populated places in Ethiopia